Tinagma grisecens is a moth in the Douglasiidae family. It is found in Palestine, Syria and Asia Minor.

References

Moths described in 1867
Douglasiidae